Spain competed at the 2016 Summer Paralympics in Rio de Janeiro, Brazil, from 7 to 18 September 2016.

Medalists

Disability classifications

Every participant at the Paralympics has their disability grouped into one of five disability categories; amputation, the condition may be congenital or sustained through injury or illness; cerebral palsy; wheelchair athletes, there is often overlap between this and other categories; visual impairment, including blindness; Les autres, any physical disability that does not fall strictly under one of the other categories, for example dwarfism or multiple sclerosis. Each Paralympic sport then has its own classifications, dependent upon the specific physical demands of competition. Events are given a code, made of numbers and letters, describing the type of event and classification of the athletes competing. Some sports, such as athletics, divide athletes by both the category and severity of their disabilities, other sports, for example swimming, group competitors from different categories together, the only separation being based on the severity of the disability.

Archery

Athletics

Men
Track & road events

Field events

Women
Track & road events

Field events

Boccia

The Spain national boccia team qualified to the BC1/BC2 mixed team tournament (and for the individual tournament in both categories) because their third position in the BISFED 2015 Boccia World Team Rankings.

Cycling

With one pathway for qualification being one highest ranked NPCs on the UCI Para-Cycling male and female Nations Ranking Lists on 31 December 2014, Spain qualified for the 2016 Summer Paralympics in Rio, assuming they continued to meet all other eligibility requirements.

Road

Track

The Men's 1000 metres C4-5 time trial is an event with cyclist of class C4 and C5. Alfonso Cabello made the C5 Paralympic Record.

Football 5-a-side

The Spain men's national Football 5-a-side team qualified to the tournament after the Russian team was banned, and because of their third position (behind Russia) in the 2015 IBSA Football 5-a-side European Championships.

5th–6th place match

Judo

Paracanoeing

Spain qualified one boat in men's KL2 in the 2016 ICF Canoe Sprint World Championships.

Powerlifting

Sailing

One pathway for qualifying for Rio involved having a boat have top seven finish at the 2015 Combined World Championships in a medal event where the country had nor already qualified through via the 2014 IFDS Sailing World Championships.  Spain qualified for the 2016 Games under this criteria in the Sonar event with a thirteenth-place finish overall and the fifth country who had not qualified via the 2014 Championships.  The boat was crewed by Francisco Llobet, Hector Garcia, and Manuel Gimeno.  They qualified a second boat in the SKUD 18 event with a thirteenth-place finish overall and the fifth country who had not qualified via the 2014 Championships.  The boat was crewed by Sergio Roig and Violeta Del Reino. Spain qualified a third boat in the 2.4m event with a seventeenth-place finish overall and the seventh country who had not qualified via the 2014 Championships. The boat was crewed by Antonio Maestre.  He tied with fellow Spaniard Montes Vorcy Arturo for seventeenth place but won on the tiebreaker.

Shooting

The country sent shooters to 2015 IPC IPC Shooting World Cup in Osijek, Croatia, where Rio direct qualification was available.  They earned a qualifying spot at this event based on the performance of Juan Antonio Saavedra in the R6 – 50m Rifle Prone Mixed SH1 event.

Swimming

The top two finishers in each Rio medal event at the 2015 IPC Swimming World Championships earned a qualifying spot for their country for Rio. Teresa Perales earned Spain a spot after winning gold in the Women's 50m Backstroke S5.

Men's

Women's

Table tennis

Triathlon

Wheelchair basketball

The Spain men's national wheelchair basketball team has qualified for the 2016 Rio Paralympics. During the draw, Brazil had the choice of which group they wanted to be in.  They were partnered with Spain, who would be in the group Brazil did not select.  Brazil chose Group B, which included  Iran, the United States, Great Britain, Germany and Algeria.  That left Spain in Group A with Australia, Canada, Turkey, the Netherlands and Japan.

Quarter-finals

Semifinals

Final

Wheelchair tennis
Lola Ochoa qualified for Rio in the women's singles event via a Bipartite Commission Invitation place. Daniel Caverzaschi, Martin De La Puente and Francesc Tur qualified in the men's singles event via the standard qualification process.

See also
Spain at the 2016 Summer Olympics

References

Nations at the 2016 Summer Paralympics
2016
2016 in Spanish sport